Brodsworth Welfare AFC is a football club based in Woodlands, Doncaster, South Yorkshire, England.

History
Although the club gives its official formation date as 1912, Brodsworth Main Colliery (as they were first known) were actually founded two years earlier, entering the Sheffield Association League for their inaugural campaign in 1910–11. They joined the Yorkshire League in 1921 and won the title in 1924–25, but left the league in 1935.

After the Second World War the club returned to the league for a third spell. In 1950–51 they were relegated to Division Two after finishing second from bottom of Division One. They withdrew from the league at the end of the 1956–57 season, but returned in 1961. Two years later they were renamed Brodsworth Miners Welfare.

In their first season under the new name the club finished fourth in Division Two and were promoted to Division One, but were relegated back again after just a single season. After finishing bottom of Division Two in 1972 the club was relegated to Division Three, where they remained until withdrawing in 1976.

Welfare played in the Doncaster Senior League throughout the 1980s and won the league title in 1985. In 1988 they joined the Northern Counties East League (NCEL), entering Division Two. They were promoted to Division One when the league restructured in 1991 (despite finishing second bottom of Division Two) and floundered at the foot of the NCEL for several years, until winning promotion to the Premier Division in 1999.

In 2006 they were renamed Brodsworth Welfare, and despite finishing bottom again in 2006–07 they again avoided being demoted. They were finally relegated at the end of the 2009–10 season after again finishing bottom, and they resigned from the NCEL in the summer of 2011 after finishing bottom of Division One.

Since 2011, the club has had three spells back in the Doncaster Senior League (2011–12, 2016–17 and 2018–19) and two spells in the Central Midlands League (2012–13 to 2015–16 and 2017–18). Ahead of the 2018–19 season, the club changed its name to Brodsworth Main, this was short lived and the club again was dissolved at the end of the 2019-20 season. The club has once again been resurrected for the 2022/23 season, entering teams to play in the Doncaster Rovers Saturday and Sunday league.

Season-by-season record

Notable former players
Players that have played in the Football League either before or after playing for Brodsworth Welfare –

  Mick Carmody
  Craig Nelthorpe
  Danny Schofield
  David Speedie
  Fred Thompson
  Harry Wainwright

Ground
The club plays at the Welfare Ground, on Fourth Avenue, Woodlands, postcode DN6 7PP.

Gallery

Honours

League
Yorkshire League
Champions: 1924–25
Yorkshire League Division Two
Promoted: 1963–64
Northern Counties East League Division One
Promoted: 1998–99
Doncaster and District Senior League Premier Division
Promoted: 1984–85
Doncaster and District Senior League Division One
Promoted: 1983–84 (champions)

Cup
Sheffield and Hallamshire Senior Cup
Runners-up: 2008–09

Records
Best FA Cup performance: 4th Qualifying Round, 1926–27
Best FA Amateur Cup performance: 3rd Qualifying Round, 1957–58
Best FA Vase performance: 2nd Round, 1997–98, 2008–09
Record attendance: 1,251 vs. FC United of Manchester, FA Vase, 2006–07

References

Football clubs in South Yorkshire
Sport in the Metropolitan Borough of Doncaster
Association football clubs established in 1912
1912 establishments in England
Sheffield & Hallamshire County FA members
Sheffield Association League
Yorkshire Football League
Doncaster & District Senior League
Northern Counties East Football League
Central Midlands Football League
Mining association football teams in England
Adwick le Street